Scotiophyes is a genus of moths belonging to the subfamily Tortricinae of the family Tortricidae.

Species
Scotiophyes faeculosa (Meyrick, 1928)
Scotiophyes hemiptycha Diakonoff, 1983
Scotiophyes nebrias Diakonoff, 1984
Scotiophyes subtriangulata Wang, 2009

See also
List of Tortricidae genera

References

  2009: Taxonomic study on Scotiophyes Diakonoff from China, with the description of a new species (Lepidoptera: Tortricidae). Zootaxa, 1974: 64–68. [Abstract & excerpt: ]

External links
tortricidae.com

Archipini
Tortricidae genera